John L. Bove (August 14, 1924 – August 29, 1997) was a Canadian football player who played for the Ottawa Rough Riders. He won the Grey Cup with them in 1951. Bove previously attended West Virginia University and played football for the West Virginia Mountaineers.

References

1924 births
1997 deaths
Ottawa Rough Riders players